Jagadish Pradhan is a Nepalese weightlifter. He competed in the men's bantamweight event at the 1984 Summer Olympics.

References

Year of birth missing (living people)
Living people
Nepalese male weightlifters
Olympic weightlifters of Nepal
Weightlifters at the 1984 Summer Olympics
Place of birth missing (living people)